Shahr-e Jadid-e Shahriar (also Romanized as Shahriyar, Shahriyār, Shahryar) is a city in Basmenj District of Tabriz County, East Azerbaijan province, Iran. A new city under construction because of the large population of the metropolis of Tabriz, new apartments and villa homes will be built. Shahriar is located on the Tabriz-Ahar road. The predicted population is 170,000 on its area of 1,500 hectares.

References 

Tabriz County

Cities in East Azerbaijan Province

Populated places in East Azerbaijan Province

Populated places in Tabriz County

Planned cities in Iran